Oxford Branch refers to the following railway lines:
Oxford Branch (New Zealand)
Oxford Branch (Pennsylvania Railroad) in Delaware and Maryland, United States